Communauté d'agglomération du Grand Cahors is the communauté d'agglomération, an intercommunal structure, centred on the town of Cahors. It is located in the Lot department, in the Occitania region, southern France. Created in 2009, its seat is in Cahors. Its area is 593.2 km2. Its population was 41,795 in 2019, of which 19,937 in Cahors proper.

Composition
The communauté d'agglomération consists of the following 36 communes:

Arcambal
Bellefont-La Rauze
Boissières
Bouziès
Cabrerets
Cahors
Caillac
Calamane
Catus
Cieurac
Crayssac
Douelle
Espère
Fontanes
Francoulès
Gigouzac
Les Junies
Labastide-du-Vert
Labastide-Marnhac
Lamagdelaine
Lherm
Maxou
Mechmont
Mercuès
Le Montat
Montgesty
Nuzéjouls
Pontcirq
Pradines
Saint-Cirq-Lapopie
Saint-Denis-Catus
Saint Géry-Vers
Saint-Médard
Saint-Pierre-Lafeuille
Tour-de-Faure
Trespoux-Rassiels

References

Cahors
Cahors